"Break Down Here" is a debut song written by Jess Brown and Patrick Jason Matthews, and recorded by American country music singer Julie Roberts.  It was released in February 2004 as the lead-off single from her self-titled debut album that was released on May 24, 2004, via Mercury Nashville.  The song debuted in February 2004 and peaked at number 18 on the country music charts.

History
Its b-side was a cover of Suzy Bogguss's "No Way Out", from her 1996 album Give Me Some Wheels.

The song was originally recorded as "I'd Sure Hate to Break Down Here" by country singer Trace Adkins on his 2003 album Comin' On Strong. However, his version of the song was not released as a single.

Content
"Break Down Here" is a mid-tempo ballad centralizing on the narrator, who is driving by herself on the freeway, escaping a failed relationship with all of her belongings in the back of the vehicle. Realizing that her vehicle is beginning to make a noise and that she is far from an exit, she states that she would "sure hate to break down here". The phrase has a double meaning, in that she does not want the vehicle to break down, and she does not want to break down and cry ("I've made it this far without crying a single tear").

Music video
A music video was released for the song, directed by Steven Goldmann. Roberts is driving through a desolate country road with her ex-lover passed out in the shotgun seat. During the course of the video, she tosses mementos from her now finished relationship out the window, and eventually her ex-lover disappears, having been revealed to be a hallucination. Shots of Roberts singing in her stopped car while the rain is pouring outside and her car breaking down are interspersed throughout the video.

Critical reception
Kelefa Sanneh of The New York Times described the song favorably, calling it "one of the year's best country ballads" and "an aching but resolute lament".

Personnel
The following musicians performed on this track:
Shannon Forrest – drums
David Hungate – bass guitar
Tim Lauer – pump organ
Pat McLaughlin – background vocals
Gordon Mote – keyboards
Julie Roberts – lead vocals
Brent Rowan – electric guitar
Bryan Sutton – acoustic guitar, mandocello

Chart performance
"Break Down Here" spent a total of 32 weeks on the country charts, peaking at 18 in September 2004. It is Roberts' only Top 40 hit on that chart. The song also debuted at number one on the Country Singles Sales chart, making her the first female artist to debut at the top of that chart since LeAnn Rimes in 2000.

References

2003 songs
2004 debut singles
Trace Adkins songs
Julie Roberts songs
Music videos directed by Steven Goldmann
Songs written by Jess Brown
Songs written by Patrick Jason Matthews
Song recordings produced by Brent Rowan
Country ballads
Mercury Nashville singles